Turtle Beach is a public beach located on South Siesta Key in Sarasota, Florida. Turtle Beach is known for the large number of sea turtles that nest on the shore. It has roughly 2,600 feet of beach front that is accessible to the public as well as camping, picnic areas, and a children play area. There are two boat ramps to launch boats on the lagoon side of the property. The beach has had problems with erosion. Sharks have been present in the ocean at the beach.

Rows of condominiums exist at the beach.

Camping 
Turtle Beach Campground sits next to the public park and has access to Turtle Beach. The property has 41 campsites and allows guests year-round. Fires or pets are not allowed at these grounds.

References

Further reading

 

Beaches of Sarasota County, Florida